Major-General Sir Alexander James Hardy Elliot,  (23 February 1825 – 1 July 1909) was a British Army officer who became Commander-in-Chief, Scotland.

Military career
Born the son of Admiral Sir George Elliot, Elloit was commissioned as a cavalry officer on 22 February 1843. He was promoted to cornet in the 9th Queen's Royal Lancers on 18 July 1848 and to lieutenant in the 5th Dragoon Guards on 14 June 1850. He served as aide-de-camp to General Sir James Scarlett, Commander of the Heavy Brigade, at the Battle of Balaclava in October 1854 during the Crimean War. He went on to command the troops in the North British District in 1885 and retired in 1888.

He was Colonel of the 6th Dragoon Guards (Carabiners) from 1892 to 1902, when he transferred to become Colonel of the 21st (Empress of India's) Lancers, serving as such until his death in 1909.

References

 

 

 

British Army major generals
1825 births
1909 deaths
Knights Commander of the Order of the Bath
5th Dragoon Guards officers
British Army personnel of the Crimean War
9th Queen's Royal Lancers officers